Wendy and Lucy is a 2008 American drama film directed by Kelly Reichardt. Reichardt and Jon Raymond adapted the screenplay from his short story Train Choir. The film stars Michelle Williams as Wendy, a homeless woman who searches for her lost dog, Lucy (played by Reichardt's own dog of that name, who had previously appeared in Old Joy). It had its world premiere at the 2008 Cannes Film Festival and was screened at several additional film festivals before receiving a limited theatrical release in the United States on December 10, 2008.

Plot
A young woman, Wendy Carroll, is traveling to Alaska with her dog Lucy, where she hopes to find work at a cannery. They become stranded in Oregon when their car breaks down, and she lacks the funds to repair it. At a supermarket, she leaves Lucy outside while she attempts to shoplift dog food. After a meeting with the store clerk and the manager, Wendy is apprehended and taken to the police station.

After paying a fine, Wendy is released from police custody. She hurries to the grocery store, but Lucy is gone. After many failed efforts to track Lucy down, with the help of a security guard, she discovers that Lucy has been taken to a dog pound and rehomed.

When Wendy visits the mechanic to pick up her car, she learns her engine needs to be rebuilt, which would exceed the car's worth. Abandoning her car and nearly penniless, Wendy goes to the home where Lucy lives. She tearfully promises to return and departs on a Northbound train.

Cast
 Michelle Williams as Wendy Carroll
 Walter Dalton as Security guard
 Will Patton as Mechanic
 Will Oldham as Icky
 John Robinson as Andy Mooney
 Larry Fessenden as man in Park
 Deirdre O'Connell (voice) as Deb
 Lucy as herself

Release

Box office
In its opening weekend, Wendy and Lucy grossed $18,218 in 2 theaters in the United States, ranking #54 at the box office. By the end of its run, Wendy and Lucy grossed $865,695 domestically and $326,960 internationally for a worldwide total of $1,192,655.

Critical reception
The film has received generally positive reviews from critics. On the review aggregation site Rotten Tomatoes, the film holds an 85% approval rating among 185 critics, with an average score of 7.4/10. The site's consensus reads "Michelle Williams gives a heartbreaking performance in Wendy and Lucy, a timely portrait of loneliness and struggle".
On Metacritic, the film has a weighted average score of 80 out of 100, based on 32 critics, indicating "generally favorable reviews". The film won both Best Picture and Best Actress at the 12th Toronto Film Critics Association Awards.

Accolades

References

External links
 
 
 

2008 films
2008 drama films
American drama films
American independent films
Films based on short fiction
Films about poverty in the United States
Films directed by Kelly Reichardt
Films shot in Oregon
Films shot in Portland, Oregon
2008 independent films
Films shot in 16 mm film
2000s English-language films
2000s American films